The City of Greater Manila, also known simply as Greater Manila and sometimes Greater Manila Area (GMA), was a chartered city which existed during the World War II era. It was governed by the Commonwealth of the Philippines and was dissolved by Japanese occupation forces. It served as a model for the present-day Metro Manila and the administrative functions of the Governor of Metro Manila, both established three decades later during the administration of President Ferdinand Marcos.

Greater Manila was formed on January 1, 1942, by virtue of Executive Order No. 400 signed by President Manuel L. Quezon as an emergency measure. It was a merger of the cities of Manila and Quezon City and the then-Rizal towns of Caloocan, Makati, Mandaluyong, Parañaque, Pasay, and San Juan. Jorge B. Vargas was appointed Mayor of Greater Manila in December 1941. He then appointed León Guinto as his successor a month later, in January 1942.

Mayors of the towns and cities that comprised Greater Manila became assistant mayors or vice mayors of their respective localities and was under the Mayor of Greater Manila. It was also represented in the National Assembly of the Japanese-sponsored Second Philippine Republic under the at-large district of Manila.

On July 26, 1945, President Sergio Osmeña signed Executive Order No. 58, which would reduce the territories and thus dissolve the City of Greater Manila. The order took effect six days later, on August 1. The cities and towns that were once part of the city then regained their respective pre-war status.

See also
Metro Manila

References

Former cities in the Philippines
History of Metro Manila
Philippines in World War II
1941 establishments in the Philippines
1945 disestablishments in the Philippines